Tammie Brown is the stage name of Keith Glen Schubert (born September 15, 1980), an American drag performer, reality television personality, and recording artist. Brown was a fixture in the Southern California drag scene before appearing on the first season of RuPaul's Drag Race and RuPaul's Drag Race: All Stars.

Early life
Keith Glen Schubert was born to Constance Marie “Conie” Rowe and Keith H. Schubert at Corpus Christi Memorial Hospital on September 15, 1980, in Corpus Christi, Texas, but was raised in Fulton, Texas. He also lived in Mathis, Texas for a short time during junior high. He first started dressing in drag during high school, where he attended Rockport-Fulton High School, in theatre productions of Grease as Cha Cha and Into the Woods as Cinderella's Stepmother. He originally wanted his drag name to simply be "Glen Schubert", but after recommendations from fellow Texas drag queens to make up her own name, she decided to do so. During a three-way call with a friend and a boy she had a crush on, her caller ID identified her as "Bob Brown", her friend's stepdad's name, and the boy responded that "Bob Brown? You're not Bob Brown! You're Keith Glen!", to which Schubert replied "Well, I can change my name to Tammie Brown!", and she adopted it as her drag name. She also considered the name "Tootsie Turner" as a drag name, because she was a big fan of Tina Turner and the musical, Tootsie.

Career

Brown first appeared on The Surreal Life with Tammy Faye Messner. Out of drag, Schubert has appeared on How Clean Is Your House? and acted in commercials for McDonald's and UPS. Brown also performed in the Los Angeles Auditions of season 2 of America's Got Talent.

Brown was announced as one of nine contestants for the first season of RuPaul's Drag Race on February 2, 2009. She was eliminated in the second episode, placing eighth.

Brown was amongst 12 past contestants who were brought back for RuPaul's Drag Race: All Stars in 2012. Brown was paired with first-season castmate Nina Flowers to form Team Brown Flowers and was eliminated in the second episode "RuPaul's Gaff-In." "Responsitrannity," the runway theme song for All Stars, was inspired by RuPaul's first season fight with Tammie Brown. Brown, along with All Stars contestants Manila Luzon, Raven, and Latrice Royale, appeared in a television commercial for travel website Orbitz's new portal for LGBT leisure travel.

Outside of Drag Race, Brown released her debut album Popcorn on March 18, 2009.

In 2011, Brown and fellow RuPaul's Drag Race contestant Ongina were honorary trail guides for the Saddle Up LA AIDS Benefit Trail Ride.

In 2012, Brown was featured in an Allstate ad. Brown was also photographed for Gorgeous, a project that involved Armen Ra, Candis Cayne, and Miss Fame.

Brown is a member of the band the Rollz Royces with Kelly Mantle and Michael Catti. Mantle and Catti have appeared in Tammie Brown's Christmas show Holiday Sparkle at Fubar in West Hollywood, California.

She was one of thirty drag queens featured in Miley Cyrus's 2015 VMA performance.

Brown was the only season one contestant to not appear at the season ten grand finale, due to being the warm up act for Trixie Mattel's tour in August 2018.

In June 2019, Brown was one of 37 queens to be featured on the cover of New York Magazine.

Personal life
Schubert is openly gay and has been out since high school. He frequently volunteers at the Long Beach Gay and Lesbian Center.

Schubert has described his drag style as bohemian. He cites the movies What's Love Got to Do with It? and Tootsie as major inspirations for his drag.

Discography

Studio albums

Extended plays

Singles

Music videos

Filmography

Television

Music videos

Web series

References

External links
 
 
 

1980 births
Living people
America's Got Talent contestants
American drag queens
American LGBT musicians
LGBT people from Texas
People from Corpus Christi, Texas
Gay entertainers
Tammie Brown
Tammie Brown